This article contains a chronological summary of major events from the 2010 Winter Olympics in Vancouver, Canada.

Calendar
In the following calendar for the 2010 Winter Olympic Games, each blue box represents an event competition, such as a qualification round, on that day. The yellow boxes represent days during which medal-awarding finals for a sport are held. The number in each box represents the number of finals that were contested on that day.

Day 1 – February 12 (Opening ceremony)
 Death of Nodar Kumaritashvili
 Georgian luger Nodar Kumaritashvili died during training, shortly before the games officially opened.
 Opening ceremony
 In front of 60,000 attendants, Governor General Michaëlle Jean declared the games officially open. Performers at the ceremony included 300+ cultural dancers from First Nation, Inuit and Métis communities from across Canada, Nelly Furtado, Bryan Adams, Sarah McLachlan, Nikki Yanofsky, k.d. lang and Garou. The Olympic Flame was lit by Catriona Le May Doan, Steve Nash, Nancy Greene, Rick Hansen and Wayne Gretzky.

Day 2 – February 13
 Alpine skiing
 Due to poor weather conditions, the men's downhill is postponed until February 15.
 Freestyle skiing
Hannah Kearney of the United States wins the women's moguls event, while defending champion Jenn Heil of Canada wins silver.
 Short track speed skating
Lee Jung-Su of South Korea wins the men's 1500 metres event. His two teammates crashed just seconds from the end allowing Americans Apolo Ohno and John Celski to capture silver and bronze.
 Biathlon
Anastasiya Kuzmina of Slovakia wins the women's sprint event, winning independent Slovakia's first ever winter gold medal.
 Ski jumping
Simon Ammann of Switzerland wins the first gold medal awarded of the games in normal hill individual ski jump.  Ammann had previously won gold in the same event at the 2002 Winter Olympics.
 Speed skating
Sven Kramer of the Netherlands wins the 5000 metres men's speed skating event, setting a new Olympic record in 6:14.60.

Day 3 – February 14
 Biathlon
 Vincent Jay of France wins men's sprint.
 Freestyle skiing
 Alexandre Bilodeau of Canada wins men's moguls, the first Olympic gold won by a Canadian on home soil.
 Luge
 Felix Loch of Germany wins men's singles with the fastest time in each of the four runs.
 Nordic combined
 Jason Lamy-Chappuis of France wins individual normal hill/10 km. He beat American Johnny Spillane by 0.4 seconds, the closest finish in Olympic Nordic combined history. The silver for United States and bronze for Italy are their first Olympic medals in Nordic combined.
 Speed skating
 Martina Sáblíková of the Czech Republic wins women's 3000 metres.

Day 4 – February 15
 Alpine skiing
 Didier Défago of Switzerland wins men's downhill with a time of 1:54.31. Aksel Lund Svindal of Norway took the silver with 1:54.38 and Bode Miller of the United States took the bronze with 1:54.40. The time difference of 0.09 seconds between gold and bronze is the smallest in the history of the men's Olympic downhill event.
 Cross-country
 Charlotte Kalla of Sweden wins women's 10 km freestyle. She was Sweden's first female individual gold medalist in cross-country skiing at the Winter Olympics since 1968.
 Dario Cologna of Switzerland wins men's 15 km freestyle. It is Switzerland's first gold medal in cross-country skiing at the Winter Olympics.
 Figure skating
 Shen Xue and Zhao Hongbo of China win pair skating, setting world records for the short program and overall scores. This is China's first Olympic gold medal ever in a figure skating event. For the Soviet Union, Unified Team and Russia, it was the end of their longest winning streak in the sport, which started during the 1964 Innsbruck Winter Olympics.
 Snowboarding
 Seth Wescott of the United States wins men's snowboard cross.
 Speed skating
 Mo Tae-bum of South Korea wins men's 500 m race. This is Korea's first ever gold medal in Winter Olympics outside short track speed skating.

Day 5 – February 16
 Biathlon
 Magdalena Neuner of Germany wins the gold medal for the women's 10 km pursuit with a time of 30:16.0. Anastasiya Kuzmina of Slovakia wins the silver with a time of +12.3 over the leader, and Marie-Laure Brunet of France earns the bronze with a time of +28.3 over the leader.
Björn Ferry of Sweden wins gold in the men's pursuit in a time of 33:38.4. Austrian Christoph Sumann takes silver and France's Vincent Jay bronze.
 Luge
German Tatjana Hüfner wins the women's singles.
 Snowboarding
 Maëlle Ricker of Canada wins gold in the women's snowboard cross, Déborah Anthonioz of France wins silver and Olivia Nobs of Switzerland wins bronze.
 Speed skating
 Lee Sang-hwa of South Korea wins women's 500 m race beating the current world record holder Jenny Wolf of Germany, with whom she was paired, by 0.05 seconds.

Day 6 – February 17
 Alpine skiing
Lindsey Vonn of the U.S. wins the gold medal in the women's downhill, the first of five events in which she will compete.
 Cross-country skiing
Russian Nikita Kriukov wins the men's sprint ahead of compatriot Alexander Panzhinskiy after a photo finish. Norway's Marit Bjørgen wins the women's sprint while Petra Majdič takes bronze despite skiing with four ribs broken during warm-ups.
 Luge
Austrian brothers Andreas and Wolfgang Linger retain the luge doubles title that they won in the 2006 Games.
 Short track
 Wang Meng of China repeats her gold medal performance in the 500 m from the 2006 Winter Olympics.
 Snowboarding
 Shaun White of the U.S. team takes the gold medal at the men's snowboarding halfpipe event, performing a double McTwist 1260 to set a score of 48.4 points out of 50.
 Speed skating
 Shani Davis of the United States wins gold in 1000 m becoming the first man to win this event twice. Mo Tae-bum of South Korea and Chad Hedrick of the United States were paired together and won silver and bronze respectively, 0.38 seconds separated gold from bronze.

Day 7 – February 18
 Alpine skiing
 After weather delays, Germany's Maria Riesch skis to gold in women's combined.  Anja Pärson of Sweden manages to repeat her bronze from Turin despite having been in a serious fall the day before.
 Biathlon
 Norway takes two golds when Emil Hegle Svendsen and Tora Berger each win the men's individual and women's individual, respectively.  However, Norwegian biathlon legend Ole Einar Bjørndalen struggles to make his mark.
Figure skating
 Evan Lysacek of the United States wins men's singles, the first gold for the US since Brian Boitano.  Controversy arises as silver medalist Evgeni Plushenko of Russia criticizes the judging system as he performed a more difficult element, the quadruple toe loop, though scored lower because of poorer form. Lysacek never performed a quadruple jump in his long program.
Snowboarding
 Torah Bright won Australia's second medal of the Games in women's halfpipe, and she had a surprise at the end - her parents had travelled in secret to support her at the slope.
Speed skating
 Christine Nesbitt captured Canada's first speedskating gold medal of the Vancouver Games in the women's 1000 metres, outskating her main World Cup rival, Annette Gerritsen of Netherlands by just 0.02 second.

Day 8 – February 19
 Cross-country skiing
 Norway's Marit Bjørgen wins her third medal (second gold) in Vancouver.
 Skeleton
Despite complaints about possible aero-dynamic elements to her helmet, Amy Williams of Great Britain wins the women's skeleton. She is the first British athlete to win an individual Winter Olympic gold medal in thirty years.

Day 9 – February 20
 Short track
 In the second semifinal of the women's 1500 m, China's Wang Meng, a strong contender for a medal, caused a crash and knocked out United States' Katherine Reutter and South Korea's Cho Ha-Ri who were in qualifying positions. Wang was disqualified due to impeding and Reutter and Cho were allowed to advance to the final resulting in a large 8-woman final.
Ski jumping
 The medal winners in large hill individual repeat from the normal hill, with Switzerland's Simon Ammann winning his fourth individual gold medal in the Olympics, a record.
Speed skating
 Netherlands' Mark Tuitert skated to a surprise gold victory over favored American Shani Davis who took silver in men's 1500 m.

Day 10 – February 21
 Alpine skiing
 Bode Miller of the United States wins the men's combined earning his first Olympic gold. He was ranked 7th after the downhill event but jumped to gold with the 3rd fastest time in the slalom. Aksel Lund Svindal of Norway led after the downhill event but veered off-course in the slalom.
 Biathlon
 Evgeny Ustyugov wins the men's mass start ending Russia's 16-year gold medal drought in this event. He won in 35:35.7 and with no penalties. Despite incurring three penalties, Martin Fourcade of France captures the silver medal 10.5 seconds behind Ustyugov.
 Germany's Magdalena Neuner continues her strong performance in Vancouver earning her third medal, second gold.
Bobsleigh
 Germany's bobsleigh driver André Lange, with Kevin Kuske, won his fourth gold in four career races, taking the two-man competition to become the most successful pilot in Olympic history.
Men's ski cross
 Switzerland's Michael Schmid takes the first gold medal in the inauguration of ski cross.
Ice hockey
 The Canadian men's team are defeated by the Americans 5–3, forcing them into a more difficult path into the final rounds.
Speed skating
 Although she won bronze in Turin, Ireen Wüst of Netherlands claims gold in the 1500 metres against expectations. It was the second at these games where the gold medal favorite in this distance had been defeated by a Dutch, Kristina Groves settled for silver as did Shani Davis who lost to Mark Tuitert on the men's side.

Day 11 – February 22
Figure skating
 Canadians Tessa Virtue and Scott Moir win the first ever North American Ice dancing gold medal; they are joined on the stand by their best friends and training partners Americans Meryl Davis and Charlie White.  The Russians Oksana Domnina and Maxim Shabalin narrowly win bronze amidst criticism of their costumes and Aborigine-inspired routine over Torino silver medalists Tanith Belbin and Ben Agosto.

Day 12 – February 23
Speed skating
 Lee Seung-hoon of South Korea skated to an Olympic record of 12:58.55 in the men's 10000 metres. In a bizarre twist, Sven Kramer of the Netherlands who beat Lee by over four seconds was disqualified when he failed to make a lane change, losing both the record and the gold medal. Lee is the first Asian to medal in an Olympic 10000 m speed skating event.
Women's ski cross
 Canadian Ashleigh McIvor wins the gold medal in the first women's ski cross event at the Winter Olympics.
Nordic combined
Austria defends their Olympic gold in the team large hill/4 × 5 km while United States gets their first medal in the event.

Day 13 – February 24
Alpine skiing
 The women's giant slalom competition was originally scheduled for February 24, but the event was halted after the first run due to low clouds and poor visibility and rescheduled to 09:30 PST on February 25.

Short track
 In the women's 3000 m relay in short track speed skating South Korea was disqualified after finishing first in the final, giving China the gold medal. China set a world record in the event. Coincidentally, the judge who disqualified South Korea, Australian judge James Hewish, was also the same judge who disqualified South Korea's Kim Dong-Sung in the men's 1500 m at the 2002 Winter Olympics.

Speed skating
 Czech Republic's Martina Sáblíková earns her third medal and second gold by winning the women's 5000 metres. Skating in the last pairing, she started her race with the fastest 200 m split, never relinquished her lead, and crossed the finish line just 0.48 seconds ahead of Germany's Stephanie Beckert.  Sáblíková was so tired at the end of the race that she crumpled to the ice after slowly gliding to a standstill. She then had her coach take off her skates and started her victory lap in her socks.

Ice hockey
 Canada defeats Russia in a 7–3 win in men's ice hockey and advances to the semi-finals against Slovakia.

Day 14 – February 25
Ice hockey
 Canada defeats the United States 2–0 in the gold medal game in women's ice hockey.

Figure skating
 South Korea's Kim Yuna wins the gold medal in the ladies' singles, setting a new world record of 150.06 points for the free skate and for the combined total of 228.56 points. The United States fails to win a medal in this discipline for the first time since Innsbruck in 1964.

Nordic combined
Bill Demong win gold in the 10 km individual large hill event, becoming the first American to win gold in any Nordic skiing event (cross-country skiing, ski jumping, or Nordic combined) at a Winter Olympics.

Day 15 – February 26
Biathlon
 Norway's Ole Einar Bjørndalen anchors the Norwegian team to gold in the men's relay. With 11 medals, he is now the second most successful Winter Olympic athlete in history. While Norway won gold by over 38 seconds, only 0.2 seconds separated silver won by Austria from bronze won by Russia.

Curling
 Sweden defeats Canada 7–6 in the gold medal game in women's curling.

Short track
 China's Wang Meng wins the gold in the women's 1000 metres which gives China a gold medal sweep of the women's events. It was Wang's third gold medal of the Games. Katherine Reutter wins the silver giving the United States its first medal in an Olympic women's event since the 1994 Winter Olympics in Lillehammer.
 Minor controversy ensues in the final turn of the men's 500 metres when Canada's François-Louis Tremblay and South Korea's Sung Si-Bak fell while Charles Hamelin and Apolo Ohno finished first and second. The Canadian judge disqualified Ohno for causing Tremblay to crash and ruled that Sung had slipped on his own and not by Hamelin's actions.

Day 16 – February 27

Curling
 Canada defeats Norway 6–3 in the gold medal game in men's curling.

Cross-country skiing
 Poland's Justyna Kowalczyk becomes the first woman from her country ever to win a Winter Olympic gold medal in the 30 km classical cross-country event.

Day 17 – February 28
Cross-country skiing
Norway's Petter Northug narrowly beats Germany's Axel Teichmann at the finish line by only 0.3 seconds to win the gold medal in the men's 50 km classical.

Ice hockey
 Canada defeats the United States in overtime, 3–2, in the gold medal game in men's ice hockey. The United States goalie Ryan Miller is named MVP of the tournament.

Medal count
 Canada ends the Olympics with 14 gold medals, the most for any country (host or otherwise) in any Winter Olympics. The U.S. ends with 37 total medals, also the most for any country (host or otherwise) in any Winter Olympics.

Closing ceremony
The closing ceremony took place at 5:30 Pacific Time (01:30 1 March UTC) at BC Place Stadium. In the Antwerp Ceremony, the Olympic flag was given to Mayor Anatoly Pakhomov of Sochi, Russia, host of the 2014 Winter Olympics.
 Michael Bublé, Neil Young, Avril Lavigne, K-os, Nickelback, Simple Plan, Hedley, Marie-Mai and Alanis Morissette performed. William Shatner, Catherine O'Hara and Michael J. Fox also appeared.

See also
 Chronological summary of the 2006 Winter Olympics
 Chronological summary of the 2008 Summer Olympics
 Chronological summary of the 2010 Summer Youth Olympics

References

External links

 Vancouver 2010 Olympic and Paralympic Winter Games, official website
Vancouver 2010 from the International Olympic Committee

2010 Winter Olympics
2012